Khurtsidze (Georgian: ხურციძე) is a Georgian surname. Notable people with the surname include:

Avtandil Khurtsidze (born 1979), Georgian boxer 
David Khurtsidze (born 1993), Russian football midfielder
Nino Khurtsidze (born 1975), Georgian chess player 

Georgian-language surnames